Into the Blue may refer to:

Books
Into the Blue (book), a 2003 book by Canadian writer Andrea Curtis
 Into the Blue, alternative title of the 2002 book Blue Latitudes by Tony Horwitz
 Into the Blue, a 1990 novel by Robert Goddard

Music
Into the Blue (Guy Barker album), 1995
Into the Blue (Jacky Terrasson and Emmanuel Pahud album), 2003
Into the Blue (Monique Brumby album), 2006
Into the Blue (Broken Bells album), 2022
"Into the Blue" (Kylie Minogue song), 2014
"Into the Blue" (Moby song), 1995
"Into the Blue", a song by The Mission from the album Carved in Sand, 1990
"Into the Blue", a song by Geneva from the album Further, 1997
"Into the Blue", a song by Shobaleader One featuring Squarepusher from the album Shobaleader One: d'Demonstrator, 2010

Films
Into the Blue (1950 film), a British comedy directed by Herbert Wilcox
Into the Blue, a 1996 TV movie adaption of the Goddard novel, starring John Thaw
Into the Blue (2005 film), a 2005 film directed by John Stockwell
Into the Blue 2: The Reef,  an action film directed by Stephen Herek; sequel to the 2005 film

Other uses 
 "Into The Blue" (Cold Case), an episode of Cold Case

See also
Into the Blue Again, a 2006 album by The Album Leaf